Braintree may refer to:

Places
 Braintree, Essex, a town in England
 Braintree District
 Braintree (UK Parliament constituency)
 Braintree Town F.C., a football club in the town
 Braintree, Massachusetts, a city in Norfolk County, Massachusetts, United States
 Braintree High School
 New Braintree, Massachusetts, a town in Worcester County, Massachusetts, United States
 Braintree, Vermont, a town in Orange County, Vermont, United States

Transportation
 Braintree Airport, in Braintree, Massachusetts, United States (closed 1970)
 Braintree railway station (England), in Braintree, Essex, England
 Braintree station (MBTA), in Braintree, Massachusetts, United States

Other uses
 Braintree (company), a payments service provider based in Chicago, Illinois, United States